Alleghany County Courthouse is a historic courthouse building located at Sparta, Alleghany County, North Carolina. It was built in 1933, and is a two-story, H-shaped Classical Revival style brick building.  The front facade features a tetrastyle Tuscan order portico.  It was built after "The Big Fire" of 1932 destroyed the courthouse and a block of businesses and homes.

It was listed on the National Register of Historic Places in 1979.

References

County courthouses in North Carolina
Courthouses on the National Register of Historic Places in North Carolina
Government buildings completed in 1933
Buildings and structures in Alleghany County, North Carolina
National Register of Historic Places in Alleghany County, North Carolina